Ivanovo Yuzhny Airport (Ivanovo South)  is an airport in Russia located 7 km southwest of Ivanovo.  It is a civilian facility that handles medium-sized airliners.  It is not to be confused with the Ivanovo Severny airlift base.

Airlines and destinations

The airport code "IWA" is also shared by Mesa Airport in Maricopa County, Arizona; however, to avoid confusion, the consensus is that Mesa Airport uses the FAA code "AZA" instead.

References

External links 
Ivanovo Yuzhny Official website 
Aviation Safety Network: accident history for IWA

Airports built in the Soviet Union
Airports in Ivanovo Oblast